Esa Mujer may refer to:

 Esa Mujer (album), a 1985 album by Verónica Castro
 Esa mujer (TV series), an Argentine telenovela